An Elixir for Existence is the second studio album by the Norwegian gothic metal band Sirenia, released in 2004. The album follows in the same vein as the previous At Sixes and Sevens, but includes a new female vocalist, Henriette Bordvik. From this album, Sirenia has been presented as a 4-piece band, with Morten Veland as the only permanent member.

Musical style 
Like its predecessor album At Sixes and Sevens (2002), the musical style in An Elixir for Existence corresponds to the more classic Sirenia's gothic metal of their origins, with some elements of symphonic death-doom.

A large number of the songs are concerned with mental conditions, be it depression ("Voices Within"), drug use ("Euphoria") or thoughts of suicide ("The Fall Within"); of course, the meanings of all of these songs are subject to further conjecture.

Track listing
All songs written by Morten Veland.

Personnel
Credits for An Elixir for Existence adapted from liner notes.

Sirenia
 Morten Veland – harsh vocals (tracks 1–5, 7, 8), guitars, bass, keyboards, drum programming, mixing
 Henriette Bordvik – female vocals (tracks 1–8)

Additional personnel
 Kristian Gundersen – clean male vocals (tracks 3, 4, 7)
 Anne Verdot – violin (tracks 2–4, 6)
 Damien Surian, Mathieu Landry, Emmanuelle Zoldan, Sandrine Gouttebel, Emilie Lesbros – choir (tracks 1–5, 7–9)

Production
 Joachim Luetke – cover art, artwork
 Terje Refsnes – mixing, engineering
 Emile M.E. Ashley – photography
 Ulf Horbelt – mastering
 Wolfgang Voglhuber – photography

References

External links
 Metallum Archives
 An Elixir for Existence at discogs.com

2004 albums
Sirenia (band) albums
Napalm Records albums